World by the Throat (German: Der Würger der Welt) is a 1920 German silent crime film directed by E. A. Dupont and starring Max Landa, Hanni Weisse and Ernst Rückert.

The film's sets were designed by the art director Robert A. Dietrich.

Cast
Max Landa as detective
Hanni Weisse as Sonja
Leo Connard as Professor Georg Melville
Ernst Rückert as Mc Lean, his Assistant
Rosa Liechtenstein as Eugenie, his daughter
Arthur Bergen as Iwan Nedela, A Russian student
Edmund Löwe as Boris Alschkin, a nihilist
Leopold von Ledebur as Algernon Selkirk, the American sugar mogul
Erich Waldow as Barnes, mate of the detective

References

External links

Films of the Weimar Republic
Films directed by E. A. Dupont
German silent feature films
1920 crime films
German crime films
German black-and-white films
1920s German films
1920s German-language films